Harvey Lee Justice III (born March 2, 1996), better known as his online alias Chef Henny, is an American recording artist, chef, and internet personality. He is most known for his musical work and alignment with the Hennessy Cognac brand. He first gained recognition posting cooking skits to Facebook in May 2016, and has since accumulated millions of views on his content.

Musical career 
Harvey J began his musical career posting to his Facebook page. In 2012 he featured on Driicky Graham's debut single "Dial Tone". In 2015 he made his own solo debut "Make It Bounce" that was released under Owsla. After cosigns from Skrillex, his debut single was in the Beatport Top 100 Dubstep Charts for 96 days. On March 22, Harvey J self-released his debut mixtape “Pancakes & Hennessy”.

Personal life 
Harvey J was born and spent the majority of his life in Durham, NC. He cites Durham and growing up around violence as his inspiration to be an entertainer.

Controversies 
Harvey J is openly against signing to a record label. In June, 2016 Uproxx reported that Harvey J received an offer totaling $3,000,000 from Belaire and DJ Khaled's We The Best management to replace his branding alignment with Belaire Rosé Lux instead of Hennessy. This offer was subsequently denied by Harvey prompting a brief social media feud between the two artists.

Harvey J is known for his equivocate antics and his frequently mendacious posts on social media to boost his following, using publicity stunts such as lying about his medical, living, or financial conditions, which were met with critisicm by some of his followers.

References

External links 
 

American rappers
Living people
21st-century American rappers
1996 births